The women's team pursuit race of the 2013 World Single Distance Speed Skating Championships was held on 24 March at 18:06 local time.

Results

References

Women team pursuit
World